The 29th Golden Globe Awards, honoring the best in film and television for 1971, were held on February 6, 1972.

Winners and nominees

Film

{| class="wikitable" style="width=100%"
! colspan="2" |Best Motion Picture
|-
! style="width=50%" |Drama
! style="width=50%" |Comedy or Musical
|-
| valign="top" |
The French Connection
A Clockwork Orange
The Last Picture Show
Mary, Queen of Scots
Summer of '42
| valign="top" |
Fiddler on the Roof
The Boy Friend
Kotch
A New Leaf
Plaza Suite
|-
! colspan="2" |Best Performance in a Motion Picture – Drama
|-
!Actor
!Actress
|-
| valign="top" |
Gene Hackman – The French Connection as Det. Jimmy "Popeye" Doyle
Peter Finch – Sunday Bloody Sunday as Daniel Hirsh
Malcolm McDowell – A Clockwork Orange as Alex DeLarge
Jack Nicholson – Carnal Knowledge as Jonathan Fuerst
George C. Scott – The Hospital as Dr. Herbert Bock
| valign="top" |
Jane Fonda – Klute as Bree Daniels
Dyan Cannon – Such Good Friends as Julie Messinger
Glenda Jackson – Mary, Queen of Scots as Queen Elizabeth I
Vanessa Redgrave – Mary, Queen of Scots as Mary, Queen of Scots
Jessica Walter – Play Misty for Me as Evelyn Draper
|-
! colspan="2" |Best Performance in a Motion Picture – Comedy or Musical
|-
!Actor
!Actress
|-
| valign="top" |
Topol – Fiddler on the Roof as Tevye
Bud Cort – Harold and Maude as Harold Chasen
Dean Jones – The Million Dollar Duck as Professor Dooley
Walter Matthau – Kotch as Joseph P. Kotcher
Gene Wilder – Willy Wonka & the Chocolate Factory as Willy Wonka
| valign="top" |
Twiggy – The Boy Friend as Polly Browne
Sandy Duncan – Star Spangled Girl as Amy Cooper
Ruth Gordon – Harold and Maude as Maude Chardin
Angela Lansbury  – Bedknobs and Broomsticks as Eglantine Price
Elaine May – A New Leaf as Henrietta Lowell
|-
! colspan="2" |Best Supporting Performance in a Motion Picture – Drama, Comedy or Musical
|-
!Supporting Actor
!Supporting Actress
|-
| valign="top" |
Ben Johnson – The Last Picture Show as Sam the Lion
Tom Baker – Nicholas and Alexandra as Rasputin
Art Garfunkel – Carnal Knowledge as Sandy
Paul Mann – Fiddler on the Roof as Lazar Wolf
Jan-Michael Vincent – Going Home as Jimmy Graham
| valign="top" |
 Ann-Margret – Carnal Knowledge as Bobbie
Ellen Burstyn – The Last Picture Show as Lois Farrow
Cloris Leachman – The Last Picture Show as Ruth Popper
Diana Rigg – The Hospital as Barbara Drummond
Maureen Stapleton – Plaza Suite as Karen Nash
|-
! colspan=2 | Other
|-
!Best Director
!Best Screenplay
|-
| valign="top" |
William Friedkin – The French Connection
Peter Bogdanovich – The Last Picture Show
Norman Jewison – Fiddler on the Roof
Stanley Kubrick – A Clockwork Orange
Robert Mulligan – Summer of '42
| valign="top" |
The Hospital – Paddy ChayefskyThe French Connection – Ernest Tidyman
Klute – Andy and Dave Lewis
Kotch – John Paxton
Mary, Queen of Scots – John Hale
|-
!Best Original Score
!Best Original Song
|-
| valign="top" |Shaft – Isaac HayesThe Andromeda Strain – Gil Mellé
Le Mans – Michel Legrand
Mary, Queen of Scots – John Barry
Summer of '42 – Michel Legrand
| valign="top" |"Life Is What You Make It" (Marvin Hamlisch, Johnny Mercer) – Kotch
"Long Ago Tomorrow" (Burt Bacharach, Hal David) – The Raging Moon
"Rain Falls Anywhere It Wants To" (Laurence Rosenthal, Alan and Marilyn Bergman) – The African Elephant
"Something More" (Quincy Jones) – Honky
"Theme from Shaft" (Isaac Hayes) – Shaft
|-
!Best Foreign Film (English Language)
!Best Foreign Film (Foreign Language)
|-
| valign="top" |
Sunday Bloody Sunday (United Kingdom)The African Elephant (United Kingdom)
Friends (United Kingdom)
The Go-Between (United Kingdom)
The Red Tent (Italy/USSR)
The Raging Moon (United Kingdom)
| valign="top" |The Policeman (Israel)Claire's Knee (France)
The Conformist (Italy)
Tchaikovsky (USSR)
To Die of Love (France)
|-
!New Star of the Year – Actor
!New Star of the Year – Actress
|-
| valign="top" |Desi Arnaz Jr. – Red Sky at Morning as William "Steenie" StenopolousTom Baker – Nicholas and Alexandra as Rasputin
Timothy Bottoms – Johnny Got His Gun as Joe Bonham
Gary Grimes – Summer of '42 as Hermie
Richard Roundtree – Shaft as John Shaft
John Sarno – The Seven Minutes as Jerry Griffith
| valign="top" |Twiggy – The Boy Friend as Polly BrowneSandy Duncan – The Million Dollar Duck as Katie Dooley
Cybill Shepherd – The Last Picture Show as Jacy Farrow
Janet Suzman – Nicholas and Alexandra as Alexandra
Delores Taylor – Billy Jack as Jean Roberts
|}

Television

Best Series – Drama Mannix
Marcus Welby, M.D.
Medical Center
The Mod Squad
O'Hara, U.S. Treasury

Best Series – Comedy or Musical
 All in the Family
The Carol Burnett Show
The Flip Wilson Show
The Mary Tyler Moore Show
The Partridge Family

Best Television Film
 The Snow Goose
Brian's Song
Duel
The Homecoming: A Christmas Story
The Last Child

Best Actor – Drama Series
 Robert Young – Marcus Welby, M.D.
Raymond Burr – Ironside
Mike Connors – Mannix
William Conrad – Cannon
Peter Falk – Columbo

Best Actress – Drama Series
 Patricia Neal – The Homecoming: A Christmas Story
Lynda Day George – Mission: Impossible
Peggy Lipton – The Mod Squad
Denise Nicholas – Room 222
Susan Saint James – McMillan & Wife

Best Actor – Comedy or Musical Series
 Carroll O'Connor – All in the Family
Herschel Bernardi – Arnie
Jack Klugman – The Odd Couple
Dick Van Dyke – The New Dick Van Dyke Show
Flip Wilson – The Flip Wilson Show

Best Actress – Comedy or Musical Series
 Carol Burnett – The Carol Burnett Show
Lucille Ball – Here's Lucy
Shirley Jones – The Partridge Family
Jean Stapleton – All in the Family
Mary Tyler Moore – The Mary Tyler Moore Show

Best Supporting Actor
 Edward Asner – The Mary Tyler Moore Show
James Brolin – Marcus Welby, M.D.
Harvey Korman – The Carol Burnett Show
Rob Reiner – All in the Family
Milburn Stone – Gunsmoke

Best Supporting Actress
 Sue Ane Langdon – Arnie
Amanda Blake – Gunsmoke
Gail Fisher – Mannix
Sally Struthers – All in the Family
Lily Tomlin – Rowan and Martin's Laugh-In

References
IMdb 1972 Golden Globe Awards

029
1971 film awards
1971 television awards
February 1972 events in the United States
1971 awards in the United States